The Pay-Khoy Range is a mountain range at the northern end of the Ural Mountains. It lies within the Nenets Autonomous Okrug.

Geography

The ridge is extended from northwest to southeast. It is located on the Yugorsky Peninsula, in the eastern part of the Nenets Autonomous Okrug. The ridge continues to Vaygach Island, thus separating the Barents Sea and the Kara Sea. The highest point of Pay-Khoy is the mountain of Moreiz.

The areas around Pay-Khoy do not have permanent population. The closest permanent settlements are Amderma and Ust-Kara, Nenets Autonomous Okrug The range is located in the tundra, to the north of the tree line.

Geology
The Pay-Khoy range forms a curved orogen together with the Ural Mountains, Vaygach Island and the Novaya Zemlya archipelago. The Pay-Khoy and Novaya Zemlya are younger than the orogeny that formed the Ural mountains. They were formed during the Cimmerian Orogeny between the Late Triassic and Early Jurassic.

Bibliography
Kovalskiy, M.A. Northern Urals and the Coastal Range Pai-Khoi. Volume 1. Research Expeditions of the Imperial Russian Geographic Society in 1847, 1848 and 1850.

References

Mountain ranges of Russia
.
Ural Mountains